Kritou may refer to:
Kritou Marottou, Paphos District, Cyprus
Kritou Tera, Paphos Districe, Cyprus